Lal Bakhsh (born 4 November 1943) is a former Pakistani cyclist. He competed in the team pursuit event at the 1964 Summer Olympics.

References

External links
 

1943 births
Living people
Pakistani male cyclists
Olympic cyclists of Pakistan
Cyclists at the 1964 Summer Olympics
Place of birth missing (living people)